Screen Islands is a group of islands extending northwest from Aguda Point for 1.5 nautical miles (2.8 km) across the entrance to Hidden Bay, off the west coast of Graham Land. First charted by the Belgian Antarctic Expedition under Gerlache, 1897–99. So named by the United Kingdom Antarctic Place-Names Committee (UK-APC) in 1958 because they form a screen across the entrance to Hidden Bay.

See also 
 List of Antarctic and sub-Antarctic islands

Islands of Graham Land
Danco Coast